Guyi Shen (born 8 March 1979, in Hangzhou, China) is an entrepreneur best known as the founder and CEO of Save22, South-East Asia's largest mobile shopping application.

Early life and education
Shen was born in Hangzhou, China on 8 March 1979.  He spent his early years in London, Canada and  Newcastle, Australia.  He moved to Sydney, Australia in 1996 where he attended UNSW on a Co-Op Scholarship.  He graduated in 2000 with a B.Sc in BIT.

Career
Shen began his career at Procter & Gamble as a Lotus Notes programmer, he then went on to work at Westpac, Nortel Networks and IBM.  In 2010 Shen moved to Singapore and founded Save22 with Ronald Cheung.  Save22 is the largest mobile price comparison app in South East Asia

Television Work

Shen was featured on Episode 3 of the reality TV series Angel's Gate, which began broadcasting on Channel NewsAsia in February 2012. The show gives budding entrepreneurs in Asia an opportunity to pitch business ideas to investors.  On the show, Shen agreed to a deal to exchange 10% of the company for mentorship.  This agreement was widely ridiculed as an example of investors taking advantage of entrepreneurs in the Singapore startup ecosystem. It later was revealed that the agreement never progressed beyond the TV studio.

References

Living people
Businesspeople from Hangzhou
1979 births